The Nova Scotia Regional Junior Hockey League is a Junior "C" ice hockey league in Nova Scotia, Canada, sanctioned by Hockey Canada. League playoff winners compete in the Maritime-Hockey North Junior C Championships.

History 
In 1999 the West Nova Junior Hockey League began as the first Junior C circuit sanctioned by Hockey Nova Scotia. The league was reorganized prior to the 2004-05 season as the Nova Scotia Junior C Hockey League. It was renamed prior to the 2016-17 season.

Barrington Ice Dogs were the first team to repeat as provincial champion winning titles in 2001, 2004, 2005, 2006 and 2009. Eastern Shore Jr. Mariners would win back-to-back championships in 2010 and 2011 with the Chester Clippers duplicating the feat in 2012 and 2013. Spryfield Attack became a three-time winner in 2018 after previous titles in 2014 and 2016.

Justin MacLellan of the Avon River Rats made headlines after a 10-point game on January 14, 2018.

Teams

Defunct teams

 Antigonish Jr. C Hockey Club (2000-04)
 Avon River Rats (2007-18) - renamed Windsor Royals
 Barrington Ice Dogs (2004-15)
 Bedford Wolverines (2015-17)
 Chebucto Canadians (2000-04)
 Chester Clippers/Northside Vics (2008-13; 2013-14) return as Chester Castaways 2019
 Claire Lions (2005-15)
 Cumberland/Colchester Colts (2016-19)
 East Hants Penguins/Halifax Thunder (2004-06; 2006-09)
 Harbour Crunch/Eastern Shore Jr. Mariners (2006-09; 2009-11)
 Fundy Phantoms/Rhinos (2004-13; 2013-15)
 Metro Jaguars (2015-17)
 New Waterford Jets (2005-11)
 North Shore Storm/Oxford Colts/Amherst Colts (2004-08; 2009-10; 2010-12; 2012-14; 2015-16) - renamed Cumberland/Colchester Colts
 Shannon Huskies (2012-13)
 South Shore Wild (2007-14)
 Thorburn Mohawks (2000-04)
 Valley Fuelers (2009-11)
 Windsor Royals (2007-2019)
 Yarmouth Admirals (2006-09)
 Yarmouth Kings (2009-10)
 Yarmouth Raiders (2000-05)

Champions

Teams in bold went on to win the Maritime-Hockey North Junior C Championship.

See also
List of ice hockey teams in Nova Scotia

References

External links
Nova Scotia Regional Junior Hockey League website

Ice hockey leagues in Nova Scotia
C